Line 3 is a rapid transit line on the Kunming Metro, serving the city of Kunming, China. It links Line 2 at Dongfeng Square, and links Line 6 at East Coach Station. It is an east-west line of the system.

It opened in August 2017 along with Line 6.

Opening timeline

Route
Line 3 runs in Xishan District, Wuhua District, Panlong District and Guandu District.

References

03
2017 establishments in China
Railway lines opened in 2017